Paramoebidae is a family of Amoebozoa, classified under Dactylopodida. It has also been classified under gymnamoebae. It includes the genera Korotnevella, Hollandella, and Paramoeba.

References

Amoebozoa families
Discosea